The 2011 Open de Rennes was a professional tennis tournament played on hard courts. It was the sixth edition of the tournament which was part of the 2011 ATP Challenger Tour. It took place in Rennes, France between 10 and 16 October 2011.

ATP entrants

Seeds

 1 Rankings are as of October 3, 2011.

Other entrants
The following players received wildcards into the singles main draw:
  Grégoire Burquier
  Arnaud Clément
  Jonathan Dasnières de Veigy
  Gilles Müller

The following players received entry from the qualifying draw:
  Ilija Bozoljac
  Daniel Evans
  Nikola Mektić
  Ivo Minář

Champions

Singles

 Julien Benneteau def.  Olivier Rochus, 6–4, 6–3

Doubles

 Martin Emmrich /  Andreas Siljeström def.  Kenny de Schepper /  Édouard Roger-Vasselin, 6–4, 6–4

External links
Official Website
ITF Search 
ATP official site

2011 ATP Challenger Tour
2011
2011 in French tennis